Santos FC has a professional beach soccer team based in Brazil.

Mundialito de Clubes 2012 squad

Coach: Gilberto Costa

Honours

International competitions
Mundialito de Clubes
 Group Stage: 2012
 Quarter Final: 2011

References

Beach soccer in Brazil